Duné Coetzee (born 14 May 2002) is a South African swimmer. She competed in the women's 400 metre freestyle at the 2019 World Aquatics Championships. She also competed in the women's 4 x 200 metres freestyle relay at the 2020 Summer Olympics.

In May 2022, Coetzee qualified for the 2022 World Aquatics Championships at the 2022 South Africa National Swimming Championships in the 200 metre freestyle, 400 metre freestyle, and 200 metre butterfly. The following month, she was named as one of the female swimmers representing South Africa for the 2022 Commonwealth Games.

For the 100 metre butterfly, with preliminaries on day one of swimming at the 2022 Commonwealth Games in Birmingham, England, Coetzee was one of three South Africans to qualify for the semifinals, along with Erin Gallagher and Trinity Hearne. In the semifinals, she finished in 1:00.51 and placed fifteenth overall. Two days later, she contributed a split time of 1:59.49 to the 4×200 metre freestyle relay, helping finish fourth in 8:02.28. On 2 August, she placed tenth in the 200 metre butterfly with a time of 2:12.40. On the final day, 3 August, she ranked eighth in the preliminaries of the 400 metre freestyle, qualifying for the final with a time of 4:14.92. She swam a 4:15.53 in the final and placed eighth.

Background
Coetzee started attending the University of Georgia in 2021, where she competes collegiately as part of the Georgia Bulldogs swim team.

References

External links
 

2002 births
Living people
South African female swimmers
Swimmers at the 2018 Commonwealth Games
Commonwealth Games competitors for South Africa
Swimmers at the 2018 Summer Youth Olympics
South African female freestyle swimmers
Swimmers at the 2020 Summer Olympics
Olympic swimmers of South Africa
Sportspeople from Pretoria
21st-century South African women
Swimmers at the 2022 Commonwealth Games